Group B of the EuroBasket 2011 took place between 31 August and 5 September 2011. The group played all of its games at Šiauliai Arena in Šiauliai, Lithuania.

The group was composed of Italy, Israel, France, Latvia, Germany and current vice-champions Serbia. The three-best ranked teams advanced to the next round.

Standings

All times are local (UTC+3)

31 August

Serbia vs. Italy

France vs. Latvia

Germany vs. Israel

1 September

Latvia vs. Serbia

Israel vs. France

Italy vs. Germany

2 September

Serbia vs. Israel

Latvia vs. Italy

France vs. Germany

4 September

Israel vs. Latvia

Italy vs. France

Germany vs. Serbia

5 September

Israel vs. Italy

Latvia vs. Germany

Serbia vs. France

External links
Standings and fixtures

FIBA EuroBasket 2011
2011–12 in Israeli basketball
2011–12 in Serbian basketball
2011–12 in German basketball
2011–12 in Italian basketball
2011–12 in French basketball
2011 in Latvian sport
Sport in Šiauliai